Satyavathi Rathod (born 31 October 1969) is an Indian politician serving as the Minister for Tribal Welfare, Women and Child Welfare of Telangana since 2019. She is the first tribal woman to serve as a Minister in Telangana. She is a member of the Telangana Legislative Council from the Telangana Rashtra Samithi. Rathod previously represented the Dornakal constituency in the Andhra Pradesh Legislative Assembly in 2009 from the Telugu Desam Party.

Early and personal life 
Satyavathi Rathod was born on 31 October 1969 in Pedda Thanda hamlet in Kuravi mandal of present-day Mahabubabad district, Telangana (at the time part of Andhra Pradesh). The youngest among five siblings, her parents are Lingya Naik and Dasmi Bhai.

After Class VIII, Rathod dropped out of school and was married to Govind Rathod. He died in a road accident in July 2009. She has two sons. 

Rathod later obtained her degree from an open university.

Career 
Rathod began her political career in 1989. She joined the Telugu Desam Party and contested from the Dornakal constituency the same year but lost to Indian National Congress candidate Redya Naik. In 1995, she was elected as the Sarpanch of Gundratimadugu. Later in 2006, she won the Zila Parishad of Narsimhulapet.

In the 2009 Andhra Pradesh Legislative Assembly election, Rathod was elected as an MLA from the Dornakal constituency. In March 2014, she quit the Telugu Desam Party and joined the Telangana Rashtra Samithi. She re-contested from the same seat in 2014, losing again to Redya Naik of Congress. She did not contest in the 2018 assembly election. 

In March 2019, she was elected as a member of the Telangana Legislative Council. In September 2019, Rathod took oath as Minister of ST Welfare, Women and Child Welfare in the Second cabinet of K. Chandrashekar Rao. She became the first woman from a scheduled tribe to serve as a minister in Telangana.

References

External links

Living people
1969 births
Telangana politicians
Telangana Rashtra Samithi politicians
Members of the Telangana Legislative Council
State cabinet ministers of Telangana
Women state cabinet ministers of India
Women members of the Andhra Pradesh Legislative Assembly
Women in Telangana politics
21st-century Indian women politicians
21st-century Indian politicians
20th-century Indian women politicians
20th-century Indian politicians